Gaunt's Earthcott, sometimes spelt Gaunts Earthcott, is a hamlet in the civil parish of Almondsbury in South Gloucestershire, England. It consists of a ruined chapel, a few houses and two farms, Green Farm and Court Farm. The village is located close to the interchange between the M4 and M5 motorways. There is no real industry as such and the main economic activity in the area is farming.

Gaunt's Earthcott should not be confused with Earthcott, a couple of miles away on the B4059 road between the A38 and Yate.

References

Villages in South Gloucestershire District